Derwin (also spelled Derwyn) is an English-language given name and surname. It shares the same etymology as the name Darwin with both being derived from the Old English words ‘deor’ (deer) and ‘wine’ (friend). Notable people with the name include:

Surname
 Hal Derwin (1914–1998), American dance bandleader
 Mark Derwin (born 1960), American actor
 Scott Derwin, Australian sports administrator

Given name
 Derwin Abrahams (1903–1974), American film director
 Derwin Brown (1954–2000), American law-enforcement officer and politician
 Derwin Christian (born 1983), Guyanese cricketer
 Derwin Collins (born 1969), American basketball player
 Derwin L. Gray (born 1971), American football player
 Derwin Gray (offensive lineman) (born 1995), American football player
 Derwin James (born 1996), American football player
 Derwin Kitchen (born 1986), American basketball player
 Derwin Martina (born 1994), Dutch association football player
 Derwin Williams (born 1961), American football player

See also
Darwin (given name)
Darwin (surname)
 

Surnames from given names